Zakef Katan ( literally 'upright small'; various romanizations), often referred to simply as katan, is a cantillation mark commonly found in the Torah, Haftarah, and other books of the Hebrew Bible. The note is the anchor and final one of the Katon group, which also can include the Mapach, Pashta, Munach, or Yetiv. It is one of the most common cantillation marks. There is no limit to the number of times the Katan group can appear in a verse, and often, multiple Katan groups appear in succession. The most times in succession the group occurs is four.

The symbol for the Zakef katan is a colon. It is placed on the syllable of the word that is accented.

Zakef katan occurs in the Torah 6992 times.

Zakef katan is one of two versions of the Zakef trope, the other being Zakef gadol.

The Katan group
In the Katan group, the trope can appear in the following patterns:
Mapach Pashta Munach Zakef-Katan
Mapach Pashta Zakef-Katan
Pashta Munach Zakef-Katan
Pashta Zakef-Katan
Munach Zakef-Katan
Zakef-Katan
Yetiv Munach Zakef-Katan
Yetiv Zakef-Katan

Total occurrences

Melody

References

Cantillation marks